Welicoruss is a Russian symphonic black metal music band from Novosibirsk, Russia, formed in 2005 by leader and main composer Alexey Boganov. Their lyrics are amongst the lines of Theosophy, Philosophy the Esoteric subjects and the Occult. The band is currently signed to El-Puerto Records, Germany. As of 2019, Welicoruss have released three studio albums: Wintermoon Symphony, Apeiron, Az Esm` and on March 27, 2020, they are planning to release their fourth album, Siberian Heathen Horde.

Concept
Welicoruss delivers dark, intense and mystic sound that demonstrates how to impressively unite the contemporary metal with the dim and distant ethereal, combined with epic classical/orchestrated music. Their music recreates the icy cold atmosphere, expressing both natural feelings and personal perception of the Ancient Philosophies through their lyrics. Welicoruss reflects in their compositions their admiration of nature and search for the hidden mysteries of the secret Powers that rule the Universe.

Biography

Early years
The beginning of Welicoruss is rooted in 2002 in Novosibirsk (Western Siberia, Russia), when founder and permanent leader Alexey Boganov spontaneously decided to make a musical project which experiments with different styles for creative expression. Even then, he was a fan of such styles as symphonic, gothic, progressive, death, and black metal, all of which can be heard on his first demo “Winter Moon Symphony”. This album was released in 2004 as a super limited edition CD and included nine songs, which had almost nothing to do with the full-length 2008 release by the same name. The music of the first demo was so unusual and original for the Siberian underground scene that it was spread very fast among fans. Later in 2006 and 2007, two more versions of the mini-album of the same name would be released, but with completely different songs (except for its namesake consisting of three parts).

In that line-up, from 2008 to 2010, the band was very active in concerts and played not only in their hometown, but throughout Siberia, taking part in local festivals and becoming firmly entrenched in the Siberian underground scene. At the same time, Alexey was shooting the first video clip for the instrumental composition called “Blizzard”. Filming was led by Alexander Tretyakov, a then-famous photographer and art figure who developed the entire concept for the video. In parallel with the filming of the first video, all members were actively working at Megaton studio (Novosibirsk), recording the debut album under the guidance of the well-known Anton Ilyashenko (Ninth Val band), which was mixed by drummer Ilya Chursin.

The music of the first album was completely written by Alexey; almost all songs have a complex compositional structure and are filled with elaborate orchestral parts. Alexey was more interested in instrumental parts of music rather than vocals at that time, preferring instead to convey the unique mystical atmosphere of snow-covered Siberian forests and fields.

In fall of 2008, Welicoruss released their debut album, Winter Moon Symphony, through the CD-MAXIMUM record label and thereby became known in wider circles. Their first album received high marks from the press and genuine interest from fans, because there were not many similar bands on the Russian metal scene. Later, the band’s first overseas tour took place – they appeared on stage at Metalheads Mission 2008 open air festival in Crimea (Ukraine). It was a major breakthrough for the band, as they managed to play with such titans of heavy metal as Moonspell, Cynic, Gorgoroth, Hate, and many others, and had the opportunity to prove themselves alongside their peers.

After their return from touring, Alexey decided on the next brave step and organized a large-scale tour called the “Wintermoon Symphony Russian Tour”, covering 16 cities of Siberia, the Urals, the Volga region, and central Russia with a total length of almost 11,000 km. Without too much modesty, we can say that Welicoruss was the first black metal band from Siberia to break through and find success, significantly expanding their fan base. While on tour, during the spring of 2009, CD-MAXIMUM released their second official album (or rather an EP) Apeiron, which, in fact, consisted of various versions of existing songs (improving and revising the battle song “Slava Rusi”, along with a classic version of the same song performed by the string quartet Silenzium, and an electronic remix of “Slavonic Power”) as well as the main song “Apeiron” and the experimental and progressive song “To the Far Worlds”. This mini-album received mixed ratings, since it was too varied and avant-garde in the opinion of some critics, however many new fans praised these new songs, and hints of this style would be found again on their later album “Az Esm”.

Then in 2010, as a result of creative disagreements inside the band, Welicoruss stopped all live activity, but despite that Alexey continued to work hard on writing new songs. At the end of the year, there was a change in the band’s line-up – Alexey Boldin joined in place of the departed bass player Alexander Golovin, and Boris Voskolovich took up the keyboard. As a result of intense work with new musicians in the summer of 2011, the mini-album Kharnha appeared in the form of a digital release, consisting of three completely new songs and an original intro which made creative use of the Australian didgeridoo and other non-traditional sounds.

Shortly after Alexey met members of “Dark Theater Vizorium”, who significantly affected the work of Welicoruss – Alexander Semko, Evgeny Nakryshsky, and Alexander Tsurupa actively participated in the creation of Welicoruss’ next few videos that elevated the band to a new level of self-expression. In the winter of 2011, as a result of many months of work by Alexey and the Theater Vizorium, a brand new video was released for the title song “Kharnha”, which, together with the previously released mini-album, created the effect of a bursting bomb. In Siberia, no one has shot such music videos on these topics, and fans looked upon this new material very warmly and demanded the release of a new full-length album. Meanwhile, Alexey also made several appearances on regional TV channels, generating even deeper interest.

During 2012 Welicoruss again actively plays throughout Siberia, showing up as one of the headliners at Metal Hail Fest in Irkutsk, and in December 2012 they presented their next single and video for the epic thriller “Sons of the North”, once again surprising everyone with such high quality production and elaborate vision. This new video was shot in the Sheregesh mountains at an altitude of 2000 meters above sea level, and had the band appear in a completely different light. The video for “Sons of the North” is filled with many folklore scenes and would end up included on several lists of the most interesting metal clips not only in Siberia, but also throughout Russia and were distributed over the network for a long time.

Move to Europe
In the spring of 2013, as a result of long deliberation, Alexey and Anastasia made the brave decision to move to Prague (Czechia), effectively starting from scratch. Alexey’s former bandmates would remain in Novosibirsk, and for that reason Alexey had to find a completely new lineup in the Czech Republic. After a while spent on adapting to new conditions, he met multi-instrumentalist Gojko Maric, who became the band’s guitarist; bass player Dmitry Zhikharevich; and drummer David Urban. With that lineup, in the spring of 2014, Welicoruss began performing on Czech soil, periodically dropping into neighboring Germany and Austria and arousing genuine interest from European metalheads.

At the beginning of 2015, Welicoruss independently released their third album Az Esm, which includes 12 songs, four of them having been reworked from the previous mini-album Kharnha. While lyrics were still performed in Russian on this release, for the first time in the band’s history English translations were also presented in the booklet, which were painstakingly provided by close friend and long-time supporter of the band, Justyn “JC” Roberts, helping Welicoruss to attain an even broader global audience. The album was noted by many music critics for its compositions, for its complexity of arrangements and pristine sound, having received many high marks. At the end of the same year, the official video for title song “Az Esm” came out, showing something very different from everything the band had ever done previously. The video was made in a mysterious, surreal chamber, depicting various abstract scenes described in the lyrics. More than 30 people took part in the filming, and the video was shot during three nights in a huge theater in Novosibirsk in 2013, but the entire post-production of the video took place much later in 2015, after Alexey moved to Prague.

The whole of 2016 was filled with many concerts, as the band played many gigs in the Czech Republic, Germany, Austria, Slovakia, Netherlands, Belgium, Switzerland and even France. Welicoruss performed at some very big festivals – Ragnarök festival in Germany, Rock of Sadska Fest (Czech Republic), Czech Death Festival (Czech Republic), Gothoom festival (Slovakia), Heathen Rock Festival (Germany), and Exit Festival (Serbia). The following year of 2017 was marked by an even greater breakthrough, because the band was invited to take part in one of the largest metal festivals in Europe – Hellfest in France. During Hellfest, Welicoruss played for more than 12,000 people and received many excellent reviews as the festival left a lasting impression for both the musicians and fans old and new. Dmitry leaves the band due to changing priorities and is replaced by Ondrey Žadný and later Tomáš Magnusek on the bass guitar. In the same year, Welicoruss went on their longest tour with German melodic black metal band Wolves Den in Europe, covering 20 cities in Germany, France, Belgium, the Netherlands, Switzerland, and Austria, and, later with the Austrian post-black metallers Harakiri for the Sky on a week-long tour in the Czech Republic, Slovakia, and Hungary.

In 2018 Welicoruss would tour even more, with the band now playing several concerts every week, becoming even stronger in the European scene, and appearing at local festivals such as Horner Fest (Germany), Hammerfest (Italy), Schlichtenfest, Metal United Festival, and Wolfszeit Festival in Germany. Between concerts, the members worked on new songs and in the spring of 2018, they would present them for the first time in the Czech Republic, completely surprising fans with an even harsher sound and predominantly English lyrics. At this time, the band also makes their bold foray into the Balkans, performing in Serbia, Romania, and Hungary. In the second part of the year, Welicoruss went on a ten-day Polish tour with the Vikings Valkenrag and later plays a mini-tour in Cyprus (concerts in Necosia and Larnaca), which was a great success.

Siberian Heathen Horde album 
By the end of 2018, intensive work on the new album was underway, not only by Alexey as usual, but also with new musicians – Gojko Maric (guitar, piano, drums and orchestral parts) and Ilya Tabachnik, who thoroughly worked out all drum parts for the new album and takes an active part in writing songs, making it even more progressive and at the same time direct. Almost all of the lyrics were written by Alexey, with lyrics being further refined with deep philosophical concepts. As the musicians themselves would say – a very aggressive and challenging album, and one they take great pride in.

At the beginning of 2019, Welicoruss went to Faust Studio (Prague) and during January recorded all drum, guitar, and bass parts. For the band, it was a completely new experience, which allowed them to find their sound after much consideration, which was helped by Alexey Stetsyuk, who did the mixing and mastering of the album in his studio (Belarus). This time, Alexey was not the only one to record vocals (which on this album you can hear a wide range of different styles) but was also accompanied by Ilya Tabachnik, who performed many clean backing vocals, as well as special guest Robert Carson from the Swiss band Xaon. Gojko departs from the band for personal reasons and is replaced by Tomáš Šršeň (Innersphere, Mean Messiah) as a session guitarist.

As of November 30, 2019, the band has signed a contract with German label El Puerto Records for the release of the album Siberian Heathen Horde, which will include nine new songs. The album’s release is currently scheduled for March 27, 2020.

Discography

Demos
 2002 — "WinterMoon Symphony"
 2004 — "WinterMoon Symphony" [2nd Version]

Studio albums
 2008 — WinterMoon Symphony
 2009 — Apeiron
 2015 — Az Esm
 2020 — Siberian Heathen Horde, LP, El Puerto Records

Compilations
 2002 — Siberian xXx-treme 2 (WinterMoon Symphony, Pt. 2)
 2006 — Agarta. Young rock of Siberia — (Mermaid)
 2007 — Siberian Death Metal — (Apeiron)
 2011 — Kharnha EP, self-produced, free download
 2012 — Apeiron/Kharnha LP, previously released material, Domestic Genocide Records
 2012 — Untitled Album LP, Domestic Genocide Records
 2016 — Best of Welicoruss [Symphonic Black Metal From The Coldest Depth of Siberia]

Music videos
 2007 — "Slavonic Power" (WCG)
 2008 — "Blizzard" (WCG)
 2009 — "Slava Rusi" (WCG)
 2011 — "Kharnha" (Imperium Studio)
 2012 — "Sons of the North" (EYE Cinema)
 2015 — "Az Esm" (EYE Cinema)
 2020 — "Spellcaster" (Mateo Ťažký)
 2020 — "Siberian Heathen Horde" (Daniel Nemirovskij, Titan Cinema Production)

Band members

Current members
 Alexey Boganov – vocals, guitars (2005–present)
 Session – guitars (2019–present)
 Ilya Tabachnik – drums (2015–present)
 Tomas Magnusek – bass (2018–present)

Former members

 Pavel Filyukhin – keyboards (2005–2009)
 Ilya Chursin – drums (2006–2013)
 Anton Lorenz – guitars (2007–2008)
 Alexander Golovin – bass (2007–2010)
 Maxim Severniy – guitars (2008–2013)
 Dmitry Polyansky – keyboards (2009–2010)
 Boris Voskolovich – keyboards (2010–2012)
 Alexey Boldin – bass (2010–2013)
 David Urban – drums (2014–2015)
 Dmitriy Zhikharevich – bass (2014–2017)
 Gojko Maric – guitars, piano (2014–2019)

Timeline

External links

 

Symphonic black metal musical groups
Russian black metal musical groups
Russian symphonic metal musical groups
Musical groups from Novosibirsk